Little Italy is a general name for an ethnic enclave populated primarily by Italians or people of Italian ancestry, usually in an urban neighborhood. The concept of "Little Italy" holds many different aspects of the Italian culture. There are shops selling Italian goods as well as Italian restaurants lining the streets. A "Little Italy" strives essentially to have a version of the country of Italy placed in the middle of a large non-Italian city. This sort of enclave is often the result of periods of immigration in the past, during which people of the same culture settled together in certain areas. As cities modernized and grew, these areas became known for their ethnic associations, and ethnic neighborhoods like "Little Italy" blossomed, becoming the icons they are today.

List of Little Italys

Australia
Little Italy, Melbourne
Norton Street, Sydney
Beaumont Street, Newcastle

Canada

Little Italy, Edmonton in Alberta
Little Italy, Montreal, in Quebec 
Little Italy, Ottawa, in Ontario
Little Italy, Toronto, in Ontario 
Little Italy, Vancouver, in British Columbia
Little Italy, Windsor, in Ontario
Little Italy, Winnipeg, in Manitoba

New Zealand
 Island Bay, Wellington, is often nicknamed "Little Italy"

United Kingdom
 Little Italy in Clerkenwell, London.
 The area around Wardour Street and Old Compton Street in Soho, London used to be known as Little Italy.
 Ancoats in Manchester used to be known as little Italy.
 The area around Scotland road in Liverpool used to be known as Little Italy.
 The area around Fazeley Street in Digbeth in Birmingham used to be known as Little Italy.

United States

Several Little Italys exist in New York City, including but not limited to:
Little Italy, Manhattan
Italian Harlem
Arthur Avenue, Bronx
Morris Park, Bronx
Bensonhurst, Brooklyn
Dyker Heights, Brooklyn
Carroll Gardens, Brooklyn
Italian Williamsburg, Brooklyn
Ozone Park, Queens
Howard Beach, Queens
Middle Village, Queens
Rosebank, Staten Island
Philadelphia, home to the second-largest Italian-American population in the United States, also has several Little Italys:
 South Philadelphia – largely Italian
 Bella Vista
 Central South Philadelphia
 Girard Estate
 Italian Market
 Marconi Plaza
 Packer Park
 Passyunk West
 St. Richard
 Whitman
 Overbrook/West Philadelphia
 Areas of Kensington
 Sections of Northeast Philadelphia
 Mayfair
 Tacony
 Sections of Southwest Philadelphia
 Areas of West Kensington
New England:
North End, Boston, in Massachusetts
Little Italy, Bridgeport, in Connecticut
Federal Hill, Providence, Rhode Island
Little Italy, Waterbury, in Connecticut
Wooster Square, in New Haven, Connecticut
New York:
Dunwoodie, Yonkers, New York
Little Italy, Schenectady, in New York
Little Italy, Rochester, New York
Little Italy, Syracuse, in New York
Little Italy, Poughkeepsie, New York
Pennsylvania:
Bloomfield, Pittsburgh, Pennsylvania
Little Italy, Connellsville, in Pennsylvania
Little Italy in Erie, Pennsylvania
Roseto, Pennsylvania
New Jersey:
Chambersburg and South Trenton, New Jersey
Little Italy, Paterson, New Jersey
California:
Little Italy, San Diego, California
North Beach, San Francisco, in California
San Pedro, Los Angeles, in California
Other:
Little Italy, Clinton, in Indiana
Little Italy, Chicago, in Illinois
Little Italy, Arkansas
Little Italy, Baltimore, in Maryland
Little Italy, Wilmington, Delaware
Little Italy, Cleveland, in Ohio
Little Italy, Omaha, in Nebraska
The Hill in St. Louis, Missouri
West Seventh in St. Paul, Minnesota
Independence, Louisiana
Little Italy, Clay County, West Virginia
Little Italy, Randolph County, West Virginia

Republic of Ireland
Italian Quarter, Dublin

Sweden
Little Italy, Gothenburg

Other Italian neighborhoods
Some Italian neighborhoods may have other names, but are colloquially referred to as "Little Italy," including:

Argentina
La Boca, Buenos Aires

Australia
Norton Street: in the Sydney suburb of Leichhardt
Ramsay Street: in the Sydney suburb of Haberfield
Campbelltown/Athelstone in Adelaide
New Farm in Brisbane
New Italy, New South Wales
Griffith, New South Wales

Brazil
Mooca, São Paulo
Bixiga, São Paulo
Jundiaí, São Paulo state
Santa Felicidade, Curitiba, Paraná
Savassi, Belo Horizonte, Minas Gerais
Antonio Prado, Rio Grande do Sul

Canada
St. Leonard, a borough of Montreal with a large Italian population
LaSalle, a borough in Montreal with a large Italian population
Rivière-des-Prairies–Pointe-aux-Trembles, another borough of Montreal with a prominent Italian population
Corso Italia, a neighbourhood in Toronto
Vaughan, Ontario, A city in north of Toronto with a high population of Italians
Stoney Creek, Hamilton, Ontario
North Burnaby, British Columbia

Chile
Capitán Pastene, northwest Temuco

Kenya
Malindi District, Kilifi County

Mexico
Chipilo, Puebla
Colonia Manuel Gonzalez, Veracruz
La Merced barrio, Mexico City
Colonia Roma, Mexico City
Gutierrez Zamora, Veracruz
Colonia Diez Gutierrez, San Luis Potosi
San Pedro (Monterrey), Nuevo Leon
Nueva Italia, Michoacán
Lombardia, Michoacán
Arandas, Jalisco
Playa del Carmen, Quintana Roo

South Africa
Orange Grove, Johannesburg

United Kingdom
 Bedford, where the population is about 8% Italian or of Italian heritage.
 Hoddesdon, in Hertfordshire has a large Sicilian population.
 Glasgow is the centre of the Scottish Italian community.

United States

North Beach, San Francisco, California
San Pedro, Los Angeles, California
Little Italy, San Diego, California
Spaghetti Hill, Monterey, California
Columbine Park/Midtown, Arvada, Colorado
Little Italy/Morse Park Historic District, Wheat Ridge, Colorado
Thompsonville (Enfield), Connecticut
Town Plot in Waterbury, Connecticut
Wooster Square in New Haven, Connecticut
Italia in northern Florida
Pompano Beach, a section is partially an Italian neighborhood
Taylor Street Archives, Chicago, Illinois (The port-of-call for Chicago's Italian Americans)
Heat of Little Italy, Chicago, Illinois
Little Sicily, Chicago, Illinois
Bridgeport, Chicago, Illinois
Dunning, Chicago
Holy Rosary Neighborhood, Indianapolis, Indiana
South Des Moines, Des Moines, Iowa
Independence, Louisiana
Old Forge, Lackawanna County, Pennsylvania (Also known as "The Pizza Capital of the World" for their pizza)
Little Italy, Baltimore, Maryland
North End, Boston, Massachusetts
Columbus Park, Kansas City, Missouri
The Hill, St. Louis, Missouri
North East, Kansas City, Missouri (formerly Columbus Square)
Eastern Market, Detroit, Michigan, considered to be the city's "Little Italy"
Little Italy, Omaha, Nebraska
Seventh Avenue, Newark, New Jersey
Varick Street, Utica, New York
Dominick Street, Rome, New York
North Side, Buffalo, New York, though "Little Italy" was considered the West Side of the city
Schenectady, New York, proposed "Little Italy" from Hillary Clinton, to run through sections of downtown.
Utica, New York, East Side considered to be city's "Little Italy"
Brier Hill, Youngstown, Ohio
Italian Village (Columbus), Ohio
Italian Market Philadelphia, Pennsylvania
Bloomfield (Pittsburgh), Pennsylvania
Easton, Pennsylvania
Roseto, Pennsylvania
Federal Hill, Providence, Rhode Island
Johnston, Rhode Island has the highest percentage of Italian Americans of any municipality in the country.
Galveston, Texas, south of Houston, highest Italian-American population in the Greater Houston as well as Texas.
Judiciary Square, Washington, D.C.

Venezuela
Turen (Colonia Turen)

See also 
 Italian diaspora 
 Ethnic enclave
Chinatown

References

Further reading

 
 
 Frunza, Bogdana Simina. Streetscape and Ethnicity: New York's Mulberry Street and the Redefinition of the Italian American Ethnic Identity (ProQuest, 2008)
 
 
 Harney, Robert F. "Toronto's Little Italy, 1885-1945." in Robert F. Harney and J. Vincenza Scarpaci, eds. Little Italies in North America (1981): 41-62.
 Immerso, Michael. Newark's little Italy: The vanished first ward (Rutgers University Press, 1999).
 Juliani, Richard N. Building Little Italy: Philadelphia's Italians Before Mass Migration (Penn State Press, 2005)
 Pozzetta, George E. "The Mulberry District of New York City: The Years before World War One." in Robert F. Harney and J. Vincenza Scarpaci, eds. Little Italies in North America (Toronto: The Multicultural History Society of Ontario, 1979) pp: 7-40.
 Sandler, Gilbert. The Neighborhood: The Story of Baltimore's Little Italy (Bodine & Associates, 1974).
 

 
Italian diaspora